Hospital is a village in east County Limerick, Ireland. It is also a civil parish in the ancient barony of Smallcounty. The village's population was 653 as of the 2016 census. The village itself is situated in the townland of Barrysfarm, one of 11 in the civil parish. It lies on the River Mahore, a tributary of the River Camogue.

Name
The village acquired its name from the crusading Knights Hospitaller who built the archaeologically significant Hospital Church here before 1215. This church has the remains of three tombs, dating from the 13th and 14th centuries.

An alternative explanation, from the biography of Sir Valentine Browne, Surveyor General of Ireland (who was awarded lands in the area by Queen Elizabeth I of England), is that the village anciently formed part of the parish of Aney, and derived its name from a hospital for Knights Templar, founded in 1226 by Geoffry de Marisco, then Lord Justice of Ireland.

Transport
The "Old Cork Road" from Limerick to Mitchelstown and Cork (also known today as the R513) passes through the village.

Amenities
In 2002, the village had nine pubs - there are now only three. The village's secondary school was completed in 2000 and, as of 2018, had around 1,000 students. There is also a primary school which was completed in the summer of 2004. Hospital is also home to one of Limerick's Youthreach schools. The village shares a GAA club (Hospital-Herbertstown GAA) with the village of Herbertstown. Former Limerick GAA captain Damien Reale is a member of the club. Hospital soccer team was founded in 1881 by Sir P.J. Butler. Formerly known as Hospital Crusaders, today it is called Kilfrush Crusaders. Other recreational bodies include the local tennis and handball clubs.

Hospital also has an active Family Resource Centre, located on Knockainey Road.

There is a stone circle nearby at Ballinamona.

The village celebrated the 800th Anniversary of its foundation in 2015.

Development
In 2006, Limerick County Council published a local area development plan for Hospital which laid out plans and proposals for the future expansion of the village.

Notable people
 Roger Utlagh (c.1260–1341), cleric and statesman
 Jon Kenny (b.1957), comedian and actor
 Damien Reale (b. 1981), Limerick inter-county hurler
 Liam Reale (b. 1983), athlete
 George Cecil Bennett (1877-1963), TD for Limerick 1927-1948 and Senator 1948-1951. resident at Rathaney House (now demolished)

See also
 List of towns and villages in Ireland

References

Towns and villages in County Limerick
Civil parishes of County Limerick